Walter Schulthess (24 July 1894 – 23 June 1971) was a Swiss conductor and composer.

Schulthess was born in Zürich. He studied in Munich and Berlin, then returned to Zürich. He wrote instrumental and vocal music, and according to Nicolas Slonimsky "excelled in lyric songs, in a style resembling Othmar Schoeck's." He was married to the violinist Stefi Geyer from 1920 until her death in 1956, and with her and Paul Sacher founded the Collegium Musicum Zürich chamber orchestra in 1941. In later life he became more involved in musical organization, serving as president of the jury for the Clara Haskil International Piano Competition, from its inception in 1963 until 1969.  He died in his home city of Zürich, aged 76.

References

External links

1894 births
1971 deaths
Swiss male composers
Musicians from Zürich
20th-century male musicians
20th-century Swiss composers